"Taiyou no Gravity" is Fayray's debut single. It was released on July 29, 1998. It first entered the charts at #20 but 3 weeks later climbed to #12. The song was used as the theme song for the TBS drama "Hitoribocchi no Kimi ni".

Track listing
太陽のグラヴィティー (Taiyou no Gravity; Gravity of the sun)
太陽のグラヴィティー (HOT CHILI NACHOS MIX)
太陽のグラヴィティー (SP-1200 MIX)
太陽のグラヴィティー (original backing track)

Charts 
"Taiyou no Gravity" - Oricon Sales Chart (Japan)

External links
FAYRAY OFFICIAL SITE

1998 singles
Fayray songs
Japanese television drama theme songs
1998 songs
Songs with lyrics by Akio Inoue
Songs written by Daisuke Asakura